The Université de Moncton is a Canadian francophone university in New Brunswick. It includes campuses in Edmundston, Moncton, and Shippagan.

The university was founded in 1963 following the recommendations of the royal commission on higher education in New Brunswick. Since then, the institution has been widely regarded as the heir to several Acadian institutions of higher learning such as the Collège Saint-Joseph.

The university strives to be a generalised university, offering training and research in the fields of management, arts, social sciences, law, engineering, natural sciences, health, social work and education. As Canada's largest exclusively French-language university outside of Quebec, the university has, as of December 1, 2021, 4 655 full-time and 515 part-time enrolments; of the total number, 65.5% are from New Brunswick and 27.4% are international.

History
The Université de Moncton was born because of recommendations made in 1962 by a Commission of Inquiry on Higher Education in New Brunswick chaired by John J. Deutsch. The new university was created on June 19, 1963. Collège Saint-Joseph, the Université Sacré-Cœur in Bathurst, and the Université Saint-Louis d'Edmundston agreed to suspend their respective charters and assume the status of affiliated colleges (Collège Saint-Joseph, Collège de Bathurst, and Collège Saint-Louis). The new Université de Moncton took shape on land in Moncton's Sunny Brae neighbourhood.

In 1972, Collège Jésus-Marie in Shippagan was affiliated directly with the Université de Moncton and offered the first two years of the arts program.

Following recommendations made in 1975 by the Committee on Higher Education in the Francophone Sector in New Brunswick, chaired by Justice Louis A. LeBel, the Université de Moncton underwent a major reorganization. In 1977, the Université de Moncton became a university composed of three equal campuses, located in the three major francophone regions of the province: Edmundston, Moncton, and Shippagan. Collège Jésus-Marie became the Centre universitaire de Shippagan campus of the Université de Moncton, and Collège Saint-Louis-Maillet became the Centre universitaire Saint-Louis-Maillet campus of the Université de Moncton.

The current designations of the three constituents of the Université de Moncton are: Université de Moncton, campus d'Edmundston (UMCE), Université de Moncton, campus de Moncton (UMCM) and Université de Moncton, campus de Shippagan (UMCS).

Campuses
The university is divided into three campuses:

The Moncton Campus is home to more than 70% of the students and offers all programs, except for Forestry (offered in Edmundston) and Information Management and Sustainable Development and Coastal Zone (offered in Shippagan). Located in the north of the city, the Moncton Campus includes some twenty pavilions, the CEPS Louis-J.-Robichaud sports center, the J.-Louis-Lévesque arena, the Musée acadien, the Louise-et-Ruben-Cohen Art Gallery, and several residences and apartments to meet the needs of students (rooms, studios, and university apartments).

The Campus Universitaire d'Edmundston, in Edmundston (Edmundston Campus) is built on an elevated area of the downtown core, near the Trans-Canada Highway. It has four pavilions, a student center and a residence with the capacity to house nearly 90 students. It welcomes more than 375 students. The Pavillon sportif d'Edmundston is located on the campus grounds and includes a swimming pool, a climbing wall, different gymnasiums and more. A 2,400-seat amphitheatre used for field hockey and shows is also located next to the Pavillon sportif. Outside, there is a six-lane athletic field with bleachers.

The Shippagan Campus is located in northeastern New Brunswick. It includes four pavilions: the Irène-Léger Pavilion, the Bibliothèque, Sciences et technologies Pavilion, the Zone côtière Pavilion and the Armand-Caron Sports Pavilion. It also has the Institut de recherche sur les zones côtières VALORĒS, and four university housing buildings. The Shippagan regional pool is attached to the Armand-Caron Sports Pavilion. The campus is home to over 500 students.

Faculties
The Université de Moncton has more than 200 programs:

 Faculty of Administration (Administration)
 Faculty of Arts and Social Sciences (Arts et des sciences sociales)
 Law (Droit)
 Engineering (Ingénierie)
 Science (Sciences)
 Health Sciences and Community Services (Sciences de la santé et des services communautaires)
 Education (Sciences de l'éducation)
 Forestry School (École de foresterie)
 Information Management and Sustainable Development and Coastal Zone (Gestion de l’information et développement durable et zone côtière)

Not all faculties offer programs on each campus. In many cases, students may take the first year of a program at the Edmundston or Shippagan Campuses before having to transfer to the Moncton Campus. The School of Forestry (École de foresterie) offers courses at the Edmundston Campus only, while the Sustainable development and Coastal Zone (Développement durable et zone côtière) and Information Management (Gestion de l'information) are only offered at the Shippigan Campus. The first year of the Nursing program at the Shippagan Campus is followed by three years in Bathurst.

The Université de Moncton offers a range of studies at the graduate certificate, graduate diploma, master's and doctoral levels. The Moncton Campus is also the home of the medical training program run by the Université de Sherbrooke.

Libraries

There are six libraries and ressource centres across the three campuses: Bibliothèque Champlain (Moncton), Bibliothèque Michel-Bastarache (Moncton), Centre d'études acadiennes Anselme-Chiasson (Moncton), Centre de ressources pédagogiques (Moncton), Bibliothèque Rhéa-Larose (Edmundston) and Bibliothèque Campus de Shippagan. All records from these libraries are gathered into one catalogue: Catalogue Éloïze.

Two of these libraries, Bibliothèque Michel-Bastarache and Centre de ressources pédagogiques, are special libraries, catering to the Faculty of Law and the Faculty of Education, respectively. The Centre d'études acadiennes, found on the lower level of Bibliothèque Champlain, is a world-renowned and primary resource and archive centre for Acadian studies.

Student Life and Athletics
Many social and physical activities are offered, such as live performances, music, movies, theater, student radio, improv, student councils, swimming pool, racquetball and squash courts, gym, fitness rooms and more.

The Université de Moncton is represented by nine teams in various sports leagues in the Atlantic University Sport (AUS) and 'U Sports (formerly: Canadian Interuniversity Sport (CIS)). They compete under the name Aigles Bleus and Aigles Bleues. The University is represented by men's and women's teams of hockey, soccer, athletics teams and a cross country running teams. It also has a women's volleyball team.

The Croix-Bleue Medavie Stadium, located on the Moncton campus, seats 10,000 to 20,000. It allows the Université de Moncton to host major sporting and recreational events. It was inaugurated in 2010.

Student radio: Codiac FM and before that CKUM-FM

Noted faculty and alumni
 Michel Bastarache, Puisne Justice on the Supreme Court of Canada
 Joël Bourgeois, 3000m steeplechase runner, 2-time competitor at the Olympic Games and gold medalist at the 1999 Pan American Games
 Herménégilde Chiasson, professor, poet and playwright, and former Lieutenant Governor of New Brunswick
 Stéphane Dion, professor, academic, Cabinet Minister, and Former Liberal Party Leader
 Brian Gallant, former Premier of New Brunswick
 Corinne Gallant, professor emeritus and feminist who received the Order of Canada
 Alain Haché, Professor of physics, demonstrated superluminal electric pulse propagation
 Louis LaPierre, former professor of ecology who resigned from the Order of Canada after it was discovered that he had misrepresented his academic credentials
 Roméo LeBlanc, Former Governor General of Canada, graduated from Collège St-Joseph
 James E. Lockyer, Professor of law
 Bernard Lord, former Premier of New Brunswick, brother of Roger Lord
 Roger Lord, internationally acclaimed concert pianist and Professor of Piano at U de M, brother of Bernard Lord
 Antonine Maillet, Acadian author and winner of the Prix Goncourt
 Hubert Marcoux, French-Canadian solo sailor and author
 Percy Mockler, Canadian senator
 Jean-Guy Poitras, member of the New Brunswick Sports Hall of Fame
 Claude Roussel, sculptor, former head of art department
 Donald Savoie, professor of public administration and author
 Linda Silas, president of the Canadian Federation of Nurses Unions
 Anne-Marie Sirois, Canadian visual artist, writer and film director
 Christine St-Pierre, former Radio-Canada reporter and Quebec Minister of Culture, Communications and the Status of Women
 Camille Thériault, former Premier of New Brunswick

See also

 Higher education in New Brunswick
 Atlantic University Sport
 Canadian Interuniversity Sport
 Canadian government scientific research organizations
 Canadian university scientific research organizations
 Canadian industrial research and development organizations

References

Further reading

External links

Université de Moncton 
Léopold-Taillon building
Simon-Larouche building 
Irène Léger building

 
Educational institutions established in 1963
Forestry education
French-language universities and colleges in New Brunswick
Buildings and structures in Moncton
1963 establishments in New Brunswick
Universities in New Brunswick